The 1993 Green Bay Packers season was their 75th season overall and their 73rd in the National Football League. They had  a 9–7 record and won their first playoff berth in 11 years, but their first in a non-strike year in 21 years. The record also marked the first back-to-back winning season since the Packers 1967 season. During the regular season, the Packers finished with 340 points, ranking sixth in the National Football League, and allowed 282 points, ranking ninth. In his third year as a pro and second with the Packers, quarterback Brett Favre led the Packers offense, passing for 3,303 yards and 19 touchdowns. Favre, who played his first full season, was selected to his second of eleven Pro Bowl appearances.

In the playoffs, the Packers played in the NFC Wild Card Game against the Detroit Lions. The Packers pulled off the upset, winning 28–24, closing with a 40-yard touchdown pass from Brett Favre to Sterling Sharpe with 55 seconds left. In the NFC Divisional Playoff Game, the Packers played the Dallas Cowboys, but lost 27–17.

The Packers commemorated their 75th overall season of professional football in 1993 with a "75" logo uniform patch, one year before the NFL's diamond anniversary.

Offseason

Free agents
In the off season, the Packers signed future Pro Football Hall of Famer Reggie White in one of the biggest moves in Packers history.

1993 NFL Draft
The Green Bay Packers selected Linebacker Wayne Simmons in the first round of the 1993 NFL Draft. In the fifth round the Packers drafted quarterback Mark Brunell, who would later become Jacksonville Jaguars career
passing yards leader.

Undrafted free agents

Staff

Roster

Regular season

Opening week
The Green Bay Packers started the season strong with a 36–6 win over the Los Angeles Rams. The Packers showed a strong defense and offense in the win. The Rams finished with 53-yards rushing, and Bryce Paup and George Koonce were able to record a safety on one play. Rams quarterback, Jim Everett completed 17 of 41 passes for 175 yards and two interceptions. The offense recorded 381 total yards, scoring in six of eight possessions. Quarterback Brett Favre completed 19 of 29 passes for 264 yards and two touchdowns. For one of the touchdowns, Favre completed a 50-yard touchdown pass to Sterling Sharpe, who finished with seven catches for 120 yards.

Three game skid
After the strong start against the Rams, the Packers lost the following three games. The first came in a 20–17 loss to the Philadelphia Eagles at Lambeau Field. Despite gaining a 17–7 lead in the third quarter, the Packers only managed 159 yards of total offense in the game. Starting linebacker Brian Noble left the field with a season-ending injury as the Eagles were able to rally from behind. The Eagles gained the lead with under five minutes to play when Randall Cunningham escaped a sack from former teammate Reggie White, and firing a 40-yard touchdown pass to Eagles receiver Victor Bailey. Following a bye week, the Packers traveled to the Metrodome to play the Minnesota Vikings. The Packers again fell short of victory in the closing seconds of the game. The Packers were leading 13–12 before Jim McMahon completed a 45-yard pass on third and ten to Eric Guliford, who was wide open. With four seconds left, Vikings kicker Fuad Reveiz completed his fifth field goal to give the Vikings a 15–13 victory. The following week, the Packers lost their third straight to defending Super Bowl champions, the Dallas Cowboys.

Winning streak
After losing three of their first four games, the Packers proceeded to win six of their next seven, defeating four conference opponents. The Packers won their second game of the season, narrowly defeating the Denver Broncos on Brett Favre's birthday. At halftime the Packers held a 30–7 lead, scoring on each of their first six possessions. Brett Favre passed for 182 yards in the first half, including a 66-yard touchdown pass to Jackie Harris. John Stephens and Edgar Bennett each scored one-yard touchdown runs and Chris Jackie made three field goals. In the second half the Packers gained only 61 yards on offense. Brett Favre threw three interceptions, including one which was returned for a touchdown. Broncos quarterback John Elway completed 33 of 59 passes for 367 yards and a touchdown, helping to close the Packers lead to 30–27. The Broncos had a chance to tie or win the game on their last drive, but came up short when Reggie White was able to sack John Elway twice. After the win the Packers had another bye week.

In week eight the Packers defeated the Tampa Bay Buccaneers 37–14, bringing their record to 3–3. Brett Favre completed 20 of 35 passes for 268 yards. Sterling Sharpe caught a career-high four touchdown passes, tying a Green Bay Packer record held by Don Hutson. For the second week in a row the Packers faced a conference opponent. They defeated the Chicago Bears 17–3 and forced seven sacks and three turnovers in the game.

The Beginning of the Lambeau Leap
The Packers beat the Raiders in the final home game of the regular season. But this game will be remembered for the start of the famed Lambeau Leap. Packer LeRoy Butler forced a fumble from Raider quarterback Vince Evans that Reggie White recovered. After running 10 yards, White lateraled the ball to Butler, who ran the remaining 25 yards into the end zone. Butler then made the lunging leap into the south bleachers and inviting arms of crazed fans.
The true first "Leap" came the week before at Milwaukee County Stadium.

Schedule

Game summaries

Week 1 vs. Rams

Week 2: vs. Philadelphia Eagles

Week 4 at Vikings

Week 5: @ Dallas Cowboys

Week 6: vs. Denver Broncos

Week 8: @ Tampa Bay Buccaneers

Week 12: vs. Detroit Lions

Week 14: @ Chicago Bears

Week 16: vs. Minnesota Vikings

Standings

Awards and records
 Brett Favre, NFC leader, attempts: 522
 Brett Favre, NFC leader, completions: 318
 Brett Favre, NFC leader, interceptions (tied): 24
Robert Brooks, NFL kickoff return leader
Sterling Sharpe, NFL leader in receptions: 112
Sterling Sharpe, franchise record, most receptions in a season: 112

Milestones
Brett Favre, first 400 yard passing game (December 5)
Sterling Sharpe, fifth 1,000 Yard receiving season

References

External links
1993 Green Bay Packers at Pro-football-reference.com

1993
Green Bay Packers
Green